Haflong Government College, established in 1961, is a general degree college situated at  Haflong town of Dima Hasao district, Assam. This college is affiliated with the Assam University.

Departments

Science
Physics
Mathematics
Chemistry
Botany
Zoology

Arts
 Assamese
 Bengali
 English
History
Economics
Philosophy
Political Science

Commerce
Accountancy
Business Management

References

External links

Universities and colleges in Assam
Colleges affiliated to Assam University
Educational institutions established in 1961
1961 establishments in Assam